Bickham is an unincorporated community in Washington Parish, Louisiana, United States. The community is located   W. of Franklinton, Louisiana.

Name origin
The community name is derived from an early settler in the area. The Bickham family first settled  Washington parish in the year 1799.

References

Unincorporated communities in Washington Parish, Louisiana
Unincorporated communities in Louisiana